The Coleraine Times is a newspaper based in Coleraine, County Londonderry, Northern Ireland. The paper was taken over by Johnston Press in 2005 and is now part of Johnston Publishing (NI).

External links
 Coleraine Times site

Newspapers published in Northern Ireland
Mass media in County Londonderry
Coleraine
Johnston Publishing (NI)
Newspapers published by Johnston Press